Uday Singh (born 9 November 1952) is an Indian politician and  was a member of the 14th and 15th Lok Sabha of India. He represented the Purnia constituency of Bihar as a member of the Bharatiya Janata Party (BJP).He is the son of Smt. Madhuri Singh, who was also a two-term member of parliament from the same constituency. Before 2019 election he switched to Indian National Congress. He belongs from a richest and powerful family of bihar owned more than 18000 acres of land and Air craft. He is a businessman and very close to the BJP and Congress as well.

References

1952 births
Living people
Politicians from Patna
India MPs 2004–2009
India MPs 2009–2014
St. Stephen's College, Delhi alumni
Lok Sabha members from Bihar
National Democratic Alliance candidates in the 2014 Indian general election
Indian National Congress politicians from Bihar